The 2013 Copa Sudamericana (officially the 2013 Copa Total Sudamericana for sponsorship reasons) was the 12th edition of the Copa Sudamericana, South America's secondary international club football tournament organized by CONMEBOL. The winner qualified for the 2014 Copa Libertadores, the 2014 Recopa Sudamericana, and the 2014 Suruga Bank Championship. São Paulo were the defending champions, but lost to Ponte Preta in the semifinals.

Lanús became the fifth Argentine club to win the Copa Sudamericana, beating Brazilian club Ponte Preta in the finals to win their first title.

Qualified teams
The following teams qualified for the tournament.

Draw
The draw of the tournament was held on July 3, 2013 in Buenos Aires, Argentina.

Excluding the defending champion (entering in the round of 16), the other 46 teams were divided into four zones:
South Zone: Teams from Bolivia, Chile, Paraguay, and Uruguay (entering in the first stage)
North Zone: Teams from Colombia, Ecuador, Peru, and Venezuela (entering in the first stage)
Argentina Zone: Teams from Argentina (entering in the second stage)
Brazil Zone: Teams from Brazil (entering in the second stage)

The draw mechanism was as follows:
South Zone and North Zone:
For the first stage, the 16 teams from the South Zone were drawn into eight ties, and the 16 teams from the North Zone were drawn into the other eight ties. Teams which qualified for berths 1 were drawn against teams which qualified for berths 4, and teams which qualified for berths 2 were drawn against teams which qualified for berths 3, with the former hosting the second leg in both cases. Teams from the same association could not be drawn into the same tie.
For the second stage, the 16 winners of the first stage were drawn into eight ties. The eight winners from the South Zone were drawn against the eight winners from the North Zone, with the former hosting the second leg in four ties, and the latter hosting the second leg in the other four ties.
Argentina Zone: The six teams were drawn into three ties. Teams which qualified for berths 1–3 were drawn against teams which qualified for berths 4–6, with the former hosting the second leg.
Brazil Zone: The eight teams were split into four ties. No draw was held, where the matchups were based on the berths which the teams qualified for: 1 vs. 8, 2 vs. 7, 3 vs. 6, 4 vs. 5, with the former hosting the second leg.

To determine the bracket starting from the round of 16, the defending champion and the 15 winners of the second stage were assigned a "seed" by draw. The defending champion and the winners from Argentina Zone and Brazil Zone were assigned even-numbered "seeds", and the winners from ties between South Zone and North Zone were assigned odd-numbered "seeds".

Schedule
The schedule of the competition was as follows (all dates listed were Wednesdays, but matches may be played on Tuesdays and Thursdays as well).

Elimination phase

In the elimination phase, each tie was played on a home-and-away two-legged basis. If tied on aggregate, the away goals rule was used. If still tied, the penalty shoot-out was used to determine the winner (no extra time is played). The 15 winners of the second stage (three from Argentina Zone, four from Brazil Zone, eight from ties between South Zone and North Zone) advanced to the round of 16 to join the defending champion (São Paulo).

First stage

|-
!colspan=6|South Zone

|-
!colspan=6|North Zone

|}

Second stage

|}

Final stages

In the final stages, the 16 teams played a single-elimination tournament, with the following rules:
Each tie was played on a home-and-away two-legged basis, with the higher-seeded team hosting the second leg.
In the round of 16, quarterfinals, and semifinals, if tied on aggregate, the away goals rule was used. If still tied, the penalty shoot-out was used to determine the winner (no extra time was played).
In the finals, if tied on aggregate, the away goals rule was not used, and 30 minutes of extra time was played. If still tied after extra time, the penalty shoot-out was used to determine the winner.
If there were two semifinalists from the same association, they must play each other.

Bracket

Note: The bracket was changed according to the rules of the tournament so that the two semifinalists from Brazil would play each other.

Round of 16

|}

Quarterfinals

|}

Semifinals

|}

Finals

The finals were played on a home-and-away two-legged basis, with the higher-seeded team hosting the second leg. If tied on aggregate, the away goals rule was not used, and 30 minutes of extra time was played. If still tied after extra time, the penalty shoot-out was used to determine the winner.

Lanús won 3–1 on aggregate.

Top goalscorers

See also
2013 Copa Libertadores
2014 Recopa Sudamericana
2014 Suruga Bank Championship

References

External links
 
Copa Sudamericana, CONMEBOL.com 

 
2013
2